John Campbell may refer to:

Academia
 John Francis Campbell (1821–1885), scholar of Celtic folklore and language; inventor
 John Edward Campbell (1862–1924), mathematician credited for the Campbell-Hausdorff formula
 John Lorne Campbell (1906–1996), Scottish historian, farmer, environmentalist, and folklore scholar
 John R. Campbell (1933–2018), American dairy scientist and university administrator
 John Campbell (casting scientist) (born 1938), British engineer
 John Angus Campbell (born 1942), retired American professor of rhetoric
 John Campbell (philosopher) (born 1956), professor of philosophy at the University of California
 John Y. Campbell (born 1958), professor of economics at Harvard University

Business
 Sir John Campbell (farmer), Scottish farmer and businessman
 John Saxton Campbell (c. 1787–1855), British seigneur and shipbuilder in Lower Canada
 John W. Campbell (financier) (1880–1957), American financier
 John A. Campbell (lumber executive) (1941–2008), Australian-American timber executive

Literature and journalism
 John Campbell (editor) (1653–1728), pioneer colonial American journalist
 John Campbell (author) (1708–1775), Scottish author
 Wal Campbell or John William Wallace Campbell (1906–1979), Australian anti-Catholic journalist
 John W. Campbell (1910–1971), American science fiction writer, editor of Analog Science Fiction and Fact
 John Campbell (biographer) (born 1947), British political biographer
 John Campbell (broadcaster) (born 1964), television and radio reporter in New Zealand
 John Campbell, author of Pictures for Sad Children

Military
 John Campbell, 4th Earl of Loudoun (1705–1782), general in North America
 John Campbell, of Strachur (1727–1806), general at Pensacola in the West Florida province
 John Campbell of Stonefield (1753–1784), lieutenant–colonel at Mangalore
 John Campbell (British Army officer, died 1804), British colonel and lieutenant-governor of Plymouth
 John B. Campbell (1777–1814), soldier during the War of 1812
 John Campbell (1802–1878), British general, served in India, Knight Commander of the Star of India
 Sir John Campbell, 2nd Baronet (1807–1855), major-general, killed in attack upon the Redan at Sevastopol
 Sir John Campbell, 1st Baronet (1836–1915), major-general, R.A., served in Crimea, China, Afghan War, Zhob Valley
 John Hasluck Campbell (1855–1921), brigadier, Sutherland Highlanders, served in First World War
 John Vaughan Campbell (1876–1944), Victoria Cross recipient, brigadier-general, First World War, ADC to the King 1919–1938
 Jock Campbell (VC) or John Charles Campbell (1894–1942), major-general and Victoria Cross recipient
 John F. Campbell (general) (born 1954), U.S. Army general

Music
 John Campbell (blues guitarist) (1952–1993), American blues guitarist
 John Campbell (jazz pianist) (born 1955), American jazz pianist
 John Campbell (born 1972), American musician, bassist for Lamb of God
 John Campbell (musical composer), American musical composer

Politics

Australia
 John Thomas Campbell (1770–1830), member of the New South Wales Legislative Council
 John Campbell (Australian politician) (1802–1886), member of the New South Wales Legislative Council and the New South Wales Legislative Assembly
 John Dunmore Campbell (1854–1909), member of the Queensland Legislative Assembly

Canada
 John Campbell (Royal Navy officer) (c. 1720–1790), Commodore Governor for Newfoundland
 John Campbell (Upper Canada politician) (1789–1834)
 John Campbell (London, Ontario politician) (1823–1901), manufacturer and municipal politician in Ontario, Canada
 John Campbell (Nova Scotia politician) (1849–1887), Conservative member of the Canadian Parliament from Nova Scotia of Digby
 John A. Campbell (Manitoba politician) (1872–1963)
 John Malcolm Campbell (1874–1951)
 John Murray Campbell (born 1931), former Alberta MLA
 John Campbell (Quebec politician) (born 1936), Liberal member of the Canadian Parliament from Quebec
 John Campbell (Ontario politician) (fl. 1990s–2010s)

United Kingdom
 John Campbell, Earl of Atholl (died 1333), Scottish nobleman
 Sir John Campbell of Cawdor (nobleman) (c. 1490 – 1546), Scottish nobleman
 John Campbell of Lundy (died 1562), Scottish lawyer and courtier
 John Campbell, 3rd of Cawdor (1576–1642), Scottish nobleman and knight
 John Campbell, 1st Earl of Loudoun (1598–1661), Lord Chancellor of Scotland, president of the Privy Council
 John Campbell, 1st Earl of Breadalbane and Holland (1636–1717), Scottish MP for Argyllshire, 1669–1674
 John Campbell of Shankstown, Scottish soldier and member of the Parliament of Scotland
 John Campbell of Mamore (c. 1660–1729), MP for Dunbartonshire, 1708–1722 and 1725–1727
 John Campbell, 2nd Earl of Breadalbane and Holland (1662–1752), Lord Lieutenant of Perthshire, Chief Justice in Eyre
 John Campbell (Edinburgh MP) (1664–1739), Scottish politician
 John Campbell, 2nd Duke of Argyll (1678–1743), Scottish soldier, Lord Steward, Lord Lieutenant of Surrey
 John Campbell, 4th Duke of Argyll (1693–1770), Scottish Whig politician
 John Campbell of Cawdor (1695–1777), British MP for Pembrokeshire 1727–1747, Inverness Burghs 1754–1761, Corfe Castle 1762–1768
 John Campbell, 3rd Earl of Breadalbane and Holland (1696–1782), Scottish MP for Saltash and Ordford, Master of the Jewel Office, Vice–Admiral of Scotland
 John Campbell, 5th Duke of Argyll (1723–1806), Scottish MP for Glasgow Burghs and for Dover, Lord Lieutenant of Argyllshire
 John Campbell (1750–1826), Scottish lawyer and politician, MP for Ayr Burghs 1794–1807
 John Campbell, 1st Baron Cawdor (1753–1821), British politician, MP for Nairnshire 1777–1780 and for Cardigan Boroughs 1780–1796
 John Campbell, 1st Marquess of Breadalbane (1762–1834), also 4th Earl of Breadalbane and Holland
 John Campbell (1770–1809), Scottish politician, MP for Ayr Burghs 1807–1809, first husband of Lady Charlotte Bury
 John Campbell, 7th Duke of Argyll (1777–1847), Scottish MP for Argyllshire 1799–1820, Keeper of the Great Seal of Scotland
 John Campbell, 1st Baron Campbell (1779–1861), English MP for Stafford, Dudley and Edinburgh, Lord Chief Justice and Lord Chancellor of England
 John Campbell, 1st Earl Cawdor (1790–1860), British earl and MP for Carmarthen from 1813 to 1821
 John Campbell, 2nd Marquess of Breadalbane (1796–1862), English MP for Okehampton and for Perthshire, Lord Chamberlain of the Household
 John Campbell (1798–1830), MP for Dunbartonshire, 1826–1830
 John Campbell-Wyndham (1798–1869), known as John Henry Campbell, Member of the United Kingdom Parliament for Salisbury, 1843–1847
 John Campbell, 2nd Earl Cawdor (1817–1898), British politician, MP for Pembrokeshire 1841–1860
 John Campbell, 9th Duke of Argyll (1845–1914), Scottish MP for Argyllshire 1868–1878 and Manchester South 1895–1900, Governor General of Canada 1878–1883
 John Campbell (Irish surgeon) (1862–1929), Member of the Northern Ireland Parliament
 John Gordon Drummond Campbell (1864–1935), British Member of Parliament for Kingston upon Thames, 1918–1922
 John Campbell (Irish politician) (1870–?), Member of the United Kingdom Parliament for South Armagh 1900–1906
 John Campbell (Labour politician) (died 1937), Northern Irish trade unionist and Northern Ireland Labour Party councillor
 J. R. Campbell (communist) (John Ross Campbell, 1894–1969), Scottish communist activist and newspaper editor
 John Dermot Campbell (1898–1945), Northern Irish businessman and Ulster Unionist MP
 John Campbell, 5th Earl Cawdor (1900–1970), Scottish peer

United States
 John Campbell (1765–1828), congressman from Maryland
 John Wilson Campbell (1782–1833), U.S. federal judge & congressman from Ohio
 John Campbell (South Carolina politician) (died 1845), congressman from South Carolina
 John Campbell (US Treasurer) (1789–c. 1866), fifth Treasurer of the United States
 John Hull Campbell (1800–1868), congressman from Pennsylvania
 John Archibald Campbell (1811–1889), U.S. Supreme Court justice & Confederate official
SS John A. Campbell, a Liberty ship 
 John P. Campbell Jr. (1820–1888), congressman from Kentucky
 John Arthur Campbell (1823–1886), Virginia lawyer and politician
 John G. Campbell (1827–1903), U.S. territorial delegate from Arizona
 John Allen Campbell (1835–1880), Wyoming's first provisional governor
 John T. Campbell, 19th-century California state legislator with Civil War army service
 John Tucker Campbell (1912–1991), secretary of state of South Carolina
 John Campbell (diplomat) (born 1944), diplomat
 John F. Campbell (politician) (born 1954), Vermont state senator
 John B. T. Campbell III (born 1955), congressman from California
 John M. Campbell (judge), judge on the Superior Court of the District of Columbia

Other countries
 Sir John Campbell, of Airds (1807–1853), lieutenant-governor of St Vincent 1845–1853
 Sir John Logan Campbell (1817–1912), figure in the history of Auckland, New Zealand

Sports
 John Argentine Campbell (1877–1917), Scottish rugby union player
 John Campbell (American football) (born 1938), American football player
 John Campbell (Australian rower) (born 1942), Australian Olympic rower
 John Campbell (baseball) (1907–1995), Washington Senators pitcher
 John Campbell (cricketer) (born 1993), Jamaican cricketer
 John Campbell (curler), New Zealand curler and curling coach.
 John Campbell (footballer, born 1850s), Glasgow South Western and Scotland winger
 John Campbell (footballer, born 1869) (1869–1906), Sunderland and Newcastle United forward
 John Campbell (footballer, born 1872) (1872–1947), Celtic and Aston Villa forward
 John Campbell (footballer, born 1877) (1877–1919), Blackburn Rovers, Rangers and Scotland forward
 John Campbell (footballer, born 1988), English footballer
 John Campbell (harness racing) (born 1955), Canadian harness racing driver
 John Campbell (rower) (1899–1939), British rower and Olympic silver medalist
 John Campbell (rugby) (1889–1966), Australian rugby league footballer
 John Campbell (runner) (born 1949), New Zealand long-distance runner
 John Campbell (skier) (born 1962), alpine skier from the Virgin Islands
 John Campbell (snooker player) (born 1953), Australian snooker player
 John Cyril Campbell, English athlete and football coach

Religion
 John Campbell (17th-century minister), prisoner on the Bass Rock
 John Campbell (bishop of Argyll) (died 1613), Scottish clergyman
 John Campbell of Sorn, 17th-century Scottish minister
 John Campbell (missionary) (1766–1840), Scottish missionary in South Africa
 John Campbell (19th-century minister) (1795–1867), minister of Whitefield's Tabernacle, Moorfields, London
 John Nicholson Campbell (1798–1864), Presbyterian clergyman who served as Chaplain of the United States House of Representatives
 John McLeod Campbell (1800–1872), Scottish minister and theologian
 John McLeod Campbell (priest) (1884–1961), English Anglican priest
 John Campbell (moderator) (1758–1828), Church of Scotland minister and Moderator of the General Assembly

Other people
 John Campbell, Lord Stonefield (c. 1720 – 1801) Scottish law lord
 John Campbell of Clathick, Scottish merchant and philanthropist, Lord Provost of Glasgow
 John Henry Campbell (painter) (1757–1829), Irish painter and father of Cecilia Margaret Nairn
 John Hodgson Campbell, British painter
 John Campbell (Scottish surgeon) (1784–1867), president of the Royal College of Surgeons of Edinburgh
 John Gregorson Campbell (1836–1891), Scottish folklorist and Free Church minister
 John Campbell (architect) (1857–1942), practised in New Zealand
 John C. Campbell (1867–1919), American educator known for surveying life in the Appalachians
 John H. Campbell (1868–1928), American judge, associate justice on Arizona's territorial supreme court
 John Patrick Campbell, (1883–1962), Belfast artist and illustrator
 John Maurice Hardman Campbell, British physician, cardiologist, and medical journal editor
 John Menzies Campbell (1887–1974), Scottish dentist and dental historian
 John William Campbell (herbalist) (fl. c. early 1900s), Sierra Leonean herbalist
 John Campbell (YouTuber), British social media influencer and retired nurse educator
 John Campbell or Greg Abbey, American voice actor
 Constable John Campbell, awarded the George Medal for his part in foiling the Linwood bank robbery

See also
 Jack Campbell (disambiguation)
 John B. Campbell Handicap, thoroughbred horse race in Maryland, US
 John C. Campbell Folk School, a school in Brasstown, North Carolina
 Johnny Campbell (disambiguation)
 Jonathan Campbell (disambiguation)